The fifth season of Rookie Blue premiered on May 19, 2014 on Global. This season was originally going to be the first part of this season before it was announced that the first half have been rebranded as a single season.

Production 
On July 17, 2013, ABC and Global announced that Rookie Blue  was renewed for a fifth season, with production starting in January 2014.

On March 24, 2014, ABC and ET Canada announced that season 5 of Rookie Blue would start on July 17 and that ABC and Global would be airing half the episodes this summer and the rest "at a later date". ABC premiered the season on June 19, 2014, whilst Global announced the season premiere was set for May 19, a month ahead of its American counterpart. On August 7, 2014, creator Tassie Cameron announced, that the second half of season five would now be season 6 and air in 2015.

Season 5 introduced Oliver Becker as Inspector John Jarvis and Matt Murray as Rookie Duncan Moore. Lyriq Bent and Rachael Ancheril both returned for single-episode guest appearances following their departure from the main cast at the end of season 4, whilst Adam MacDonald was promoted to series regular.

Cast

Main 
 Missy Peregrym as Officer Andy McNally
 Gregory Smith as Officer Dov Epstein
 Charlotte Sullivan as Officer Gail Peck
 Enuka Okuma as Detective Traci Nash
 Travis Milne as Officer Chris Diaz
 Peter Mooney as Officer Nick Collins
 Priscilla Faia as Officer Chloe Price
 Adam MacDonald as Detective Steve Peck
 Matt Gordon as Sergeant Oliver Shaw
 Ben Bass as Detective Sam Swarek

Recurring 
 Lyriq Bent as Sergeant Frank Best
 Aliyah O'Brien as Dr. Holly Stewart
 Erin Karpluk as Officer Juliette Ward
 Rachael Ancheril as Detective Marlo Cruz

Episodes

U.S. Nielsen ratings 

The following is a table for the United States ratings, based on average total estimated viewers per episode, of Rookie Blue on ABC.

References 

2014 Canadian television seasons